Frances Morris (August 3, 1908 – December 2, 2003) was an American actress.

On Broadway, Morris appeared in The Passing Show of 1912 (1912) and Step This Way (1916). Her films included Thunder (1929) and Portrait of a Mobster (1961).

Born in 1908 in Springfield, Massachusetts, she died in Santa Clarita, California, in 2003.

Selected filmography 

 Thunder (1929) - Molly
 The Ridin' Fool (1931) - Sally Warren
 Ladies of the Big House (1931) - Juror (uncredited)
 Guns for Hire (1932) - Polly Clark
 Afraid to Talk (1932) - Miss Sheridan - Nurse (uncredited)
 Trailing North (1933) - Girl at 1st Outpost
 Pilgrimage (1933) - Nurse (uncredited)
 Manhattan Love Song (1934) - Chorus Girl (uncredited)
 Hollywood Mystery (1934) - Daisy - Dan's Secretary (uncredited)
 Two Heads on a Pillow (1934) - Receptionist (uncredited)
 Against the Law (1934) - Nurse (uncredited)
 The Boss Cowboy (1934) - Mary Ross
 Pals of the Range (1935) - Peggy Dawson
 I've Been Around (1935)
 Pals of the Range (1935)
 Dance Charlie Dance (1937) - First Telegraph Girl (uncredited)
 Missing Witnesses (1937) - Whitey's Secretary (uncredited)
 Hollywood Hotel (1937) - Casting Assistant (uncredited)
 Our Leading Citizen (1939) - Maid
 Florian (1940) - Office Girl (uncredited)
 Private Affairs (1940) - Secretary (uncredited)
 Manhattan Heartbeat (1940) - Tired Girl (uncredited)
 The Leather Pushers (1940) - Nurse (uncredited)
 Sandy Gets Her Man (1940) - Secretary (uncredited)
 Sky Raiders (1941, Serial) - Substitute Secretary [Chs. 6-7] (uncredited)
 No Greater Sin (1941) - Jarvis' Secretary (uncredited)
 I'll Sell My Life (1941) - Annie Winterbottom
 Never Give a Sucker an Even Break (1941) - Nurse (uncredited)
 Always Tomorrow: The Portrait of an American Business (1941) - Little Girl's Mother (uncredited)
 A Tragedy at Midnight (1942) - Hospital Desk Nurse (uncredited)
 Duffy's Tavern (1945) - Woman Who Screams (uncredited)
 The Razor's Edge (1946) - Nurse (uncredited)
 California (1947) - Mrs. Smith (uncredited)
 The Unfaithful (1947) - Agnes
 The Big Clock (1948)
 This Side of the Law (1950) - Miss Roberts
 The Captive City (1952) - Mrs. Harding
 My Son John (1952) - Secretary (scenes deleted)
 Paula (1952) - Miss Turner - Teacher (uncredited)
 Carrie (1952) - Maid (uncredited)
 The Miracle of Our Lady of Fatima (1952) - Olímpia Marto
 Because of You (1952) - Mrs. Colman (uncredited)
 Never Wave at a WAC (1953) - Maj. Cartwright (uncredited)
 Miss Sadie Thompson (1953) - Mrs. MacPhail
 Women's Prison (1955) - Miss Whittier (uncredited)
 The Night of the Hunter (1955) - Bart's wife (uncredited)
 Bobby Ware Is Missing (1955) - Sophie - Housekeeper (uncredited)
 The Price of Fear (1956) - Mrs. Weems (uncredited)
 Crime Against Joe (1956) - Nora Manning
 The Naked Hills (1956) - Woman in Store (uncredited)
 Gun for a Coward (1956) - Mrs. Anderson
 Fury at Showdown (1957) - Mrs. Williams
 Monkey on My Back (1957) - Landlady (uncredited)
 Wild Is the Wind (1957) - Party Guest #4
 Onionhead (1958) - Arlene Pierce (uncredited)
 Portrait of a Mobster (1961) - Louise Murphy
 Ichabod and Me (1962, Episode: "The Celebrity") - The Housekeeper
 The Virginian'' (1964, Episode: "The Intruders") - Mrs. Wingate

References

External links 
 
 
 

1908 births
2003 deaths
20th-century American actresses
Actresses from Massachusetts
Actors from Springfield, Massachusetts
American film actresses
American stage actresses
21st-century American women